Glutaconaldehyde is an organic compound with the formula C5H6O2. It is an unsaturated dialdehyde as is related to glutaraldehyde and glutaconic acid, but exists in its enol form due to the conjugation with the double bond.

Both the sodium and potassium salts of glutaconaldehyde are known. They are efficiently synthesized from pyridinium sulfonate.

The reaction of the glutaconaldehyde anion with acid chlorides gives the corresponding enol esters. Glutaconaldehyde can also be converted to the corresponding vinyl bromide as shown below. This product can be reacted with nucleophiles, cross-coupled using palladium, or homologated by two carbons.

References

Aldehydes